The House of Stratford is a British Noble House, originating in Stratford-on-Avon between the eleventh and thirteenth centuries. The surname is an Anglo-Saxon territorial name, a combination of the Old English strǣt (from Latin stratum), meaning 'street', ford, indicating a shallow part of a river or stream, allowing it to be crossed by walking or driving.

The people listed below do not necessarily belong to the aristocratic family.

John de Stratford (c. 1275 – 1348), Bishop of Winchester, Lord High Treasurer, Lord Chancellor, Archbishop of Canterbury
Robert de Stratford (c. 1292 – 9 April 1362), Chancellor of the Exchequer, Chancellor of the University of Oxford, Lord Chancellor, Archdeacon of Canterbury, Bishop of Chichester
Henry de Stratford Greater Clerk of the Royal Chancery under Edward III
Ralph de Stratford (c. 1300 – 1354), also known as Ralph Hatton of Stratford, Bishop of London
Thomas de Stratford (died June 12, 1396) Senior Proctor of Oxford University, Archdeacon of Gloucester, Prior of Caldwell
Andrew de Stratford (died 1399), Bishop and landowner
John Stratford (c. 1582 – c. 1634) Merchant and entrepreneur, a significant grower of tobacco in the Cotswolds
Nicholas Stratford (1633–1707), Bishop of Chester
John Stratford, 1st Earl of Aldborough (c. 1691 – 1777)
Edward Stratford, 2nd Earl of Aldborough (died 1801)
John Stratford, 3rd Earl of Aldborough (c. 1740 – 1823)
Benjamin O'Neale Stratford, 4th Earl of Aldborough (died 1833)
Henry Stratford Persse (died 1833), Irish writer
Stratford Canning, 1st Viscount Stratford de Redcliffe KG GCB PC (1786–1880), a diplomat and politician, best known as the longtime British Ambassador to the Ottoman Empire
William Samuel Stratford (22 May 1789 – 29 March 1853), English astronomer
Alfred Stratford (5 September 1853 – 2 May 1914), English national footballer and cricketer
Brigadier-General Cecil Wingfield-Stratford CB, CMG (1853–1939) a British Army officer in the Royal Engineers and an English international footballer
Esmé Cecil Wingfield-Stratford (1882–1971) an English historian, writer, mind-trainer, outdoorsman, patriot and ruralist
Sir William Stratford Dugdale, 2nd Baronet (born 1922), Aston Villa chairman
Stratford Johns (22 September 1925 – 29 January 2002), English stage, film and television actor
Graham Stratford (born 1930), English farmer, local politician and agriculturist from Alton, Hampshire.
Tony Banks, Baron Stratford (8 April 1942 – 8 January 2006), British Labour Party politician
Thomas Joshua Stratford Dugdale FRSA (born 1974), British documentary film-maker
Brice Stratford (born 1987), Shakespearean actor-manager

References

English toponymic surnames